Ismail of Ghazni was the emir of Ghazna, reigning for 7 months, from 5 August 997 until 998. He succeeded his father emir Sabuktigin, who died of an illness acquired in Balkh during a campaign in the Samanid civil war. Ismail was designated his successor by Sabuktigin on his death-bed, while Mahmud, the older brother who was involved in the Samanid civil war, was stationed in Nishapur.

Upon receiving this news Mahmud of Ghazni contested Ismail's right to the throne and divested his charge of Nishapur to his uncle Borghuz and younger brother Nur-ud-Din Yusuf and marched upon Ghazna in what is now Afghanistan.

Mahmud won the Battle of Ghazni and took the crown from Ismail. Ismail spent the rest of his life confined to a fort in Guzgan. The reason behind Sabuktigin's choice to appoint Ismail as heir over the more experienced and older Mahmud is uncertain. It may have been due to Ismail's mother being the daughter of Sabuktigin's old master, Alptigin.

References

Sources

External links
 Ismail Sebuk Tigin entry in Encyclopaedia Iranica

Ghaznavid rulers
10th-century Turkic people
10th-century rulers in Asia